James "Fly" Williams (born February 18, 1953) is an American former professional basketball player, who played in the American Basketball Association (ABA) for the Spirits of St. Louis. A street basketball player from New York, he once scored 100 points in an IS8 League game in 1978.

Early life
Born in Brownsville, Brooklyn, New York, Williams attended Madison High School, where he initially was interested in being a baseball pitcher, but was advised that he had become too tall to remain competitive in that sport.

Although Williams’ initial transition to basketball was difficult, he eventually made adjustments that allowed him to excel in his new game. Williams’ accelerated achievements were fueled by his frequent participation in street basketball games. He played with some of New York's finest street players, including World B. Free and Earl "the Goat" Manigault. When the games eventually ended, Williams would go out in search of more opportunities to play basketball.

Williams dominated Madison High hoops in the early 1970s. However, due to his poor attendance at Madison, Williams completed high school at a prep school, Glen Springs Academy in Watkins Glen, New York. The book Heaven Is a Playground discusses, among other things, the education of Fly Williams. According to sportswriter Terry Pluto, Williams took the nickname in homage to singer Curtis "Super Fly" Mayfield. Williams was known for his play at Rucker Park and The Hole in Brownsville.

College
After Williams completed high school, he was recruited by assistant basketball coach, Leonard Hamilton, to attend Austin Peay State University in Clarksville, Tennessee.

Williams arrived on campus in 1972. He was greeted by a reception which included a sky-writing demonstration spelling out name. His freshman year, playing as a guard, his scoring record was especially noteworthy. Williams averaged 29.4 points per game in 1973, fifth best in the nation. The Austin Peay Governors won a bid to the National Collegiate Athletic Association (NCAA) tournament. Williams scored 26 points in a first-round win over Jacksonville University. In the second round of the tournament, Williams scored another 26 points, but the Austin Peay Governors lost to the University of Kentucky, coached by Joe B. Hall, in overtime.

Williams scored 51 points twice in his freshman year. In his sophomore season, Williams averaged 27.5 points per game, earning a third-place scoring record in the NCAA. Once again the Governors basketball team won the bid for the NCAA tournament. Williams scored 26 points, but Austin Peay lost to Notre Dame, 108–66, in the first round. 

During his time at Austin Peay, Williams scored 1,541 points with a 28.5 point per game average. He left college due to hardship and pursued a professional career. Austin Peay responded to Williams' two year record, in 1975, by building the Dunn Center, a larger gymnasium, to accommodate the increased attendance at basketball games.

Professional career
The Denver Nuggets drafted Williams in the first round (second overall) of the 1974 ABA Draft. Following the draft, there were several offers to buy the player contract on Williams. Eventually, his contract was sold to the Spirits of St. Louis. (Bob Costas, then a young sports broadcaster, announced their games. Costas would later contribute to the book, "Loose Balls: The Short, Wild Life of the American Basketball Association," written by Terry Pluto.)

The 1974–75 basketball season was a disappointment to Williams and his team. He managed to score only 9.4 points per game for the Spirits. Williams’ scoring was erratic and he was known for his showmanship rather than his scoring proficiency.  He did not play during the following year (1975–76), after which the Spirits of St. Louis were one of two teams, along with the Kentucky Colonels, to fold as a result of the ABA-NBA merger, and Williams ended up without a team despite some interest in retaining him in the league.  He was subsequently selected by the Philadelphia 76ers in the ninth round (152nd overall) of the 1976 NBA Draft but the team did not sign him.

Williams then played in the Continental Basketball Association and the Eastern League, but he failed to receive any attractive offers from NBA teams. He later played for a team in Israel, but never did attract any serious attention of NBA scouts. Williams admits that his temperament was probably an underlying issue which predicated his lack of serious offers.

Retirement
Williams's career was eventually ended due to a being shot by an off-duty police officer. The shotgun wound left him with decreased lung capacity, and scars on his back. In retirement, Williams spent time working with disadvantaged youth and continued to play "streetball"; Williams is listed as the number two athlete on the "50 Greatest Streetballers of All Time" by the Street Basketball Association (SBA).

While playing at Austin Peay, Williams' nickname inspired a humorous fan chant: "The Fly is open, let's go Peay!"  Fans still chant "Let's Go Peay" at all basketball games.  Williams' number 35 jersey was retired by Austin Peay State University on February 5, 2009.

A book on the life of Williams was written by Knoxville, Tennessee-based author Dave Link. Called The Fly 35 (citing his jersey number at Austin Peay), it was published to coincide with the jersey retirement ceremony.

At age 64 in May 2017, Williams was arrested in Brooklyn, NY, and charged with being the alleged leader of a large heroin distribution ring.

See also
List of basketball players who have scored 100 points in a single game

Notes
 
 The New York Times article about Fly Williams' shooting incident
 Pluto, Terry, Loose Balls: The Short, Wild Life of the American Basketball Association, Simon & Schuster, 1991,

References

External links
, or Sports Reference College Basketball

1953 births
Living people
All-American college men's basketball players
Allentown Jets players
American men's basketball players
American shooting survivors
Austin Peay Governors men's basketball players
Denver Nuggets draft picks
James Madison High School (Brooklyn) alumni
Jersey Shore Bullets players
Lancaster Red Roses (CBA) players
Philadelphia 76ers draft picks
Rochester Zeniths players
Shooting guards
Small forwards
Spirits of St. Louis players
Sportspeople from Brooklyn
Basketball players from New York City